Wonderful Nightmare (lit. Miss Wife) is a 2015 South Korean romantic comedy film starring Uhm Jung-hwa and Song Seung-heon.

The early Korean working title literally translates to Wonderful Nightmare, which was retained for the international English title.

Plot
Yeon-woo is a successful lawyer who gets into an automobile accident leading her to fall into a coma. She wakes in heaven to find that her death was a clerical error and it was actually an old woman with the same name who was meant to die.

To hide the mistake, she is asked to live as another woman – a housewife who was also killed by mistake – for just one month. Married to a very ordinary civil servant named Sung-hwan with a difficult teenage daughter and a precocious six-year-old, Yeon-woo finds herself changing in unexpected ways as well as facing challenges she hasn't faced before.

Cast

Uhm Jung-hwa as Lee Yeon-woo
Song Seung-heon as Kim Sung-hwan
Kim Sang-ho as Chief Lee
Ra Mi-ran as Mi-sun
Seo Shin-ae as Kim Ha-neul
Lee Seung-ho as Kyeong-ho
Jung Ji-hoon as Kim Ha-roo
Lee Seung-ho as Choi Kyung-hoon
Lee Jun-hyeok as Section chief Choi
Kim Byung-chul as Jin-man
Go Soo-hee as Head of women's society
Kim Jae-man as Section chief Park
Jo Duk-jae as Doo-man
Hwang Geum-byul as Senior Jo
Yoon Boo-jin as Hyun-seo's mother
Lee Mi-yoon as Sung-soo's mother
Park Yoo-mil as Min-ah's mother
Lee Yong-nyeo as Kyung-rae 
Lee Woo-joo as Hyun-seo
Yoon Joo as Ji-min 
Seol Ji-yoon as Ji-min's mother
Kang Eun-ah as So-ra 
Bae Min-jung as Woman in formal dress
Kim Young-moo as Kyung-hoon's lawyer 
Lee Jong-goo as Mr. Kim, the guard 
Heo Jung-eun as Chan-mi 
Lee Hye-rin as Ji-woo 
Kwon Soo-jung as young Yeon-woo 
Ahn So-yeon as student-age Yeon-woo 
Park Sang-hyuk as Yeon-woo's assistant 
Baek Chul-min as Park Chan-jin
Hwang Suk-ha as Team leader Kim 
Yang Do-yeon as Lawyer Park 
Kim Byung-choon as Principal (cameo)
Yeom Dong-heon as Head of the district (cameo)
Kim Hye-na as Yeon-woo's mother (cameo)
Choi Il-hwa as Chairman Park (cameo)
Jung Ji-yoon as Pharmacist (cameo)
Jung Yoo-suk as Public prosecutor Choi (cameo)

Remake
A Chinese remake was released in 2017, titled Beautiful Accident. It was directed by Ho Wi Ding and stars Gwei Lun-mei and Chen Kun.

Awards and nominations

References

External links
 

2015 romantic comedy films
2010s fantasy comedy films
South Korean romantic comedy films
South Korean fantasy comedy films
South Korean films remade in other languages
2010s South Korean films
2010s Korean-language films